Polymer Bulletin is a peer-reviewed scientific journal published by Springer Science+Business Media, covering polymer science, including chemistry, physics, physical chemistry, and material science.

Impact factor 
Polymer Bulletin had a 2020 impact factor of 2.870.

Editors 
The Editors of the journal are Jochen Gutmann, Noriyoshi Matsumi, and Daewon Sohn. Klaus Müllen is the Honorary Editor of the journal. Associate Editors are Günther Auernhammer, Patrick Burch, Youssef Habibi and Gilberto Siqueira.

External links

References 

Chemistry journals
Springer Science+Business Media academic journals
Publications established in 1978
Monthly journals
English-language journals